Hagit Zabrodsky Hel-Or is an Israeli computer scientist known for her research in image processing, computer vision, and the applications of symmetry to pattern matching and computational chemistry. She is a faculty member in the computer science department at the University of Haifa.

Education and career
Hel-Or graduated from the Hebrew University of Jerusalem in 1985, earned a master's degree there in 1989, and completed her Ph.D. there in 1994, with a dissertation supervised by Shmuel Peleg.

After postdoctoral research at Bar-Ilan University and Stanford University, she returned to Bar-Ilan University in 1997 as a lecturer. She moved to the University of Haifa as a senior lecturer in 1998.

Book
With Yanxi Liu, Craig S. Kaplan, and Luc Van Gool, Hel-Or is the coauthor of the book Computational Symmetry in Computer Vision and Computer Graphics (Now Publishing, 2009).

References

External links
Home page

Year of birth missing (living people)
Living people
Israeli computer scientists
Women computer scientists
Computer vision researchers
Hebrew University of Jerusalem alumni
Academic staff of Bar-Ilan University
Academic staff of the University of Haifa